Children of Jerusalem is a series of 7 documentary films directed by Beverly Shaffer, a Canadian filmmaker, between 1991 and 1996. The series show the life in Jerusalem from the distinct points of view of the municipality's children of various cultural, economic, social and religious backgrounds.

Tamar (1991)

Neveen (1992)

Asya (1992)

Yacoub (1992)

Yehuda (1994) 

Children of Jerusalem: Yehuda focuses on the country of Israel and its capital city from the point of view of a pre-teen Hasidic boy as he gets ready to observe the religious holiday of Sukkot.

At one point in the film the ten-year-old boy explains that his name Yehuda stands for the lion. The young boy sees the lion as unique for the reason that it is powerful and not fearful of anything.

The section of Jerusalem that Yehuda resides in is serene, but only a quick stroll from noisy activity of the metropolis.  His household is composed of his father, mother and ten siblings. With a cherubic-like face, this youth has a strong yearning to be a moral Jew and Yehuda has a sincere admiration towards his beliefs and complete, unconditional confidence in his religion. Shadowing the youngster in the course of his everyday life and taking note of the various stories he tells, the documentary uncovers a pre-pubescent existence focused completely on faith, portraying Yehuda as an example of Jerusalem's substantial ultra-Orthodox society.

It's obvious that after his religious convictions, his family unit and cultural customs have an important place in Yehuda's world.  While his younger brother rests alongside him, the main character browses from the beginning to the end of an old photograph album.  It contains the pictures of his forefathers that arrived form Poland and Russia.  When looking at the photos the young title character speaks of his ancestors, as if met each one individually, when in reality they all have been deceased for many decades before his birth.

The predicament that Yehuda encounters are at times strictly connected to his religious beliefs, but in some instances they are common issues that many preteens face.  Only a small proportion of children have to be anxious regarding being teased for possessing elongated peyot [side curls], but universally many children can associate with the frustration of discovering how to ride a bike without training wheels.

Every feature that uses a child as its main subject has the danger of portraying the subject very carefully.  However Children of Jerusalem sustains a neutral space between its focal point, enabling the observer glances into the severe governmental implications of a guiltless kid's perception.

 
 Children of Jerusalem: Yehuda at the National Film Board of Canada

Ibrahim (1996) 
 Children of Jerusalem: Ibrahim at the National Film Board of Canada

Gesho (1996)

Children of Jerusalem: Gesho (1996) follows a thirteen-year-old Ethiopian boy who was one of 14,000 refugees to flee the warring African nation in hopes of finding a better life in the Jewish State of Israel (see Beta Israel).

As Gesho shares his nostalgia for the garden he left back in Ethiopia and his determination to succeed as a professional soccer player in Israel, his story of assimilation comments on Israel's Ethiopian population at large.

Through his turbulent childhood, Gesho has seen war, poverty, and physical danger, but he speaks about his life with an ease that belies the hardships he's faced — and overcome. He listens innocently as his older brother tells him about their long and dangerous exodus from Ethiopia to the Holy Land, which separated him from his family for seven years. While most adults would be shocked by such trying stories, the little boy accepts his family's fate with grace.

Years later, Gesho is still excited by the electricity and running water in his family's trailer, which were luxuries he hadn't experienced in Africa. In fact, the little boy had to leave school after the sixth grade to help his father work their farm. He doesn't say it directly, but there's no doubt that Gesho feels fortunate that he now has time for school, and that he can spend his spare time becoming a stellar soccer player.

As the upstart athlete whizzes around the soccer field during practice it's clear that his inner strength and determination have contributed to his ranking as the number two player on his intermediate team. At his young age, he already knows how to challenge himself and focus in order to improve. With excitement and determination, Gesho has little doubt that he will succeed, and with his infectious optimism, it is sure to carry him a long way.

References

External links
 Children of Jerusalem: Gesho at the National Film Board of Canada
 

1994 films
Documentary films about Jews and Judaism
National Film Board of Canada documentary series
Documentary films about children
Canadian short documentary films
Films directed by Beverly Shaffer
1990s educational films
Hebrew-language films
1996 films
Beta Israel
Documentary films about Israel
Documentary films about cities
Culture of Jerusalem
Jewish Canadian films
1990s English-language films
1990s Canadian films
Canadian educational films